International Council may refer to:

Religion
 International Bahá'í Council, an administrative institution of the Bahá'í Faith
 International Council of Christians and Jews, an umbrella organization of 38 national groups in 32 countries worldwide engaged in the Christian-Jewish dialogue
 International Council of Community Churches, a Christian denomination of ecumenically co-operating mainline Protestants and Independent Catholics based in Frankfort, Illinois
 International council of the United Methodist Church in Germany, a pilot project approved by the United Methodist General Conference in 1988
 International Council of Unitarians and Universalists, a world council bringing together Unitarians, Universalists and Unitarian Universalists
 International Council of Universities of Saint Thomas Aquinas, a worldwide network of universities inspired by the thought of Santo Tomás de Aquino
 International Lutheran Council, a worldwide association of confessional Lutheran denominations

Science
 International Council for the Exploration of the Sea, a modern intergovernmental organisation that promotes marine research in the North Atlantic
 International Council on Nanotechnology, a multistakeholder group dedicated to developing and communicating information on nano risks
 International Council for Science, an international non-governmental organization devoted to international co-operation in the advancement of science
 International Council of Societies of Industrial Design, a global organisation that promotes better design around the world
 International Council on Systems Engineering, a non-profit membership organization dedicated to the advancement of systems engineering
 International Social Science Council, an international organisation that aims to promote the social and behavioural sciences

Sports
 International Australian Football Council, a body established in 1995 to govern the sport of Australian rules football internationally
 International Cricket Council, the international governing body of cricket

Other
 International Council Correspondence, a council communist journal
 International Council of Cruise Lines, a non-profit trade association which represents the interests of 16 passenger cruise lines
 International Council on Educational Credential Evaluation, an international NGO closely affiliated both with UNESCO and the Council of Europe
 International Council for Game and Wildlife Conservation, a politically independent advisory body internationally active on a non-profit basis
 International Council of Jewish Parliamentarians (ICJP), a project supported by the Knesset, the World Jewish Congress, the Israeli Ministry of Foreign Affairs and the Israel Forum
 International Council on Monuments and Sites, a professional association that works for the conservation and protection of cultural heritage places around the world
 International Council of Museums, an international organization of museums and museum professionals which is committed to the conservation, continuation and communication to society of the world's natural and cultural heritage
 International Council of Nurses, a federation of more than 120 national nurses associations
 International Council of Women, a non-governmental organization
 International Code Council, a United States-based non-governmental organization which allows U.S. jurisdictions and other stakeholders to collaborate in the creation of model building codes and other building safety related standards
 International Dance Council, an umbrella organization for all forms of dance in the world
 International Music Council, UNESCO's advisory body on matters of music
 International Press Telecommunications Council, a consortium of the world's major news agencies and news industry vendors
 International Rehabilitation Council for Torture Victims, an independent, international health professional organisation that promotes and supports the rehabilitation of torture victims and works for the prevention of torture worldwide
 International Risk Governance Council, an independent foundation which aims to support governments, business and other organizations and to foster public confidence in risk governance and in related decision-making
 International Spiritist Council, an organization founded on November 28, 1992
 International Tin Council, an organisation which acted on behalf of the principal tin producers in Cornwall and Malaysia to buy up surplus tin stocks to maintain the price at a steady level
 International Wheat Council, an international organization established on March 23, 1949 at the initiative of the U.S. government for the purpose of egalitarian distribution of wheat to countries in a state of emergency